The Anthropologie structurale deux (also known by the title of Structural Anthropology) is a collection of texts by Claude Lévi-Strauss that was first published in 1973, the year Lévi-Strauss was elected to the Académie française. The texts are in turn a result of an earlier collection of texts, Anthropologie structurale, that he had published in 1958.

The work is considered to be the origin of the idea of structural anthropology.

Table of Contents

Perspective Views
The Scope of Anthropology
Jean-Jacques Rousseau, Founder of the Sciences of Man
What Ethnology owes to Durkheim
The Work of the Bureau of American Ethnology and Its Lessons
Comparative Religions of Nonliterate Peoples

Social Organization
The Meaning and Use of the Notion of Model
Reflections on the Atom of Kinship

Mythology and Ritual
Structure and Form: Reflections on a Work by Vladimir Propp
The Story of Asdiwal
Four Winnebago Myths
The Sex of the Sun and Moon
Mushrooms in Culture: Apropos of a Book by R.G. Wasson
Relations of Symmetry Between Rituals and Myths of Neighboring Peoples
How Myths Die

Humanism and the Humanities
Answers to Some Investigations
Scientific Criteria in the Social and Human Disciplines
Cultural Discontinuity and Economic and Social Development
Race and History

References

Works by Claude Lévi-Strauss